Lady Luck is the second full-length album by the American rock band Broadzilla, released in October 2001. The album was instrumental in Broadzilla's winning of several Detroit Music Awards.

Track listing

  Ecstasy (May) – 3:36
  Liquor Snatch (May/Essiambre) – 3:54
  Diamond Sex Goddess (May) – 3:49
  Y Did U Have 2B Psycho? (May/Essiambre) – 3:15
  High Society (May) – 5:36
  Sacred Heart Song (May) – 2:14
  Lady Luck (May) – 2:21
  On the Run (May/Essiambre) – 3:07
  Stargazer (May) – 3:35
  Four: Twenty (May/Essiambre) – 3:01
  Love Child (Sawyer/Taylor/Wilson/Richards) – 3:01
  Burn Baby Burn! (May) – 3:29
  Liquor Snatch – Detroit Techno Remix (May/Essiambre) – 20:54

Note: The track "Liquor Snatch – Detroit Techno Remix" contains two different remixes of the original track by DJ Sean Deason, separated by approximately 7:23 of dead space.

Personnel 
Rachel May (vocals, guitar)
Kim Essiambre (bass, backing vocals)
Angie Manly (drums, backing vocals)

References

2001 albums